Mary Jane Simmons (May 14, 1953 – August 13, 2004) was an American Democratic politician from Leominster, Massachusetts. She represented the 4th Worcester district in the Massachusetts House of Representatives from 1993 to 2004.

See also
 1993-1994 Massachusetts legislature
 1995-1996 Massachusetts legislature
 1997-1998 Massachusetts legislature
 1999-2000 Massachusetts legislature
 2001-2002 Massachusetts legislature
 2003-2004 Massachusetts legislature

References

1953 births
2004 deaths
Members of the Massachusetts House of Representatives
Women state legislators in Massachusetts
20th-century American women politicians
20th-century American politicians
People from Leominster, Massachusetts